The 2019–20 Oral Roberts Golden Eagles men's basketball team represented Oral Roberts University in the 2019–20 NCAA Division I men's basketball season. The Golden Eagles, led by third-year head coach Paul Mills, played their home games at the Mabee Center in Tulsa, Oklahoma as members of the Summit League. They finished the season 17–14, 9–7 in Summit League play to finish in a tie for fourth place. They defeated Omaha in the quarterfinals of the Summit League tournament before losing in the semifinals to North Dakota State.

Previous season
The Golden Eagles finished the 2018–19 season 11–21 overall, 7–9 in Summit League play, to finish in a tie for 5th place. In the Summit League tournament, they were defeated by North Dakota State in the quarterfinals.

Roster

Schedule and results

|-
!colspan=12 style=| Exhibition

|-
!colspan=12 style=| Non-conference regular season

|-
!colspan=9 style=| Summit League regular season

|-
!colspan=12 style=| Summit League tournament
|-

|-

Source

References

Oral Roberts Golden Eagles men's basketball seasons
Oral Roberts Golden Eagles
Oral Roberts Golden Eagles men's basketball
Oral Roberts Golden Eagles men's basketball